"Fly High Michelle" is a power ballad by American rock band Enuff Z'Nuff that was released as a single in 1990.

It was the biggest hit of their career, reaching No. 47 on the Billboard Hot 100, and No. 27 on the Mainstream Rock chart.

Background
The song was written by lead vocalist Donnie Vie about a friend who had died.

Personnel
Donnie Vie – lead vocals, guitars and keyboards
Chip Z'Nuff – bass guitar, guitars and vocals
Derek Frigo – lead guitar
Vikki Fox – drums

Charts

References

1990 singles
Atco Records singles
1990s ballads
1990 songs
Glam metal ballads
Commemoration songs
Psychedelic songs
Enuff Z'nuff songs